The Democratic Union of Slovakia (DEÚS) was a political party in Slovakia led by Jozef Moravčík.

History
The party was created on 23 April 1994 by a merger of Alternative Political Realism and the Alliance of Democrats of Slovakia. In the parliamentary elections in September/October that year the party received 8.6% of the vote, winning 15 of the National Council.

On 25 March 1995 the party merged with the National Democratic Party to form the Democratic Union.

References

Defunct political parties in Slovakia
Liberal conservative parties in Slovakia
Political parties established in 1994
Political parties disestablished in 1995
1994 establishments in Slovakia
1995 disestablishments in Slovakia
Liberal parties in Slovakia